Gustavo Artacho (born 15 September 1967) is an Argentine cyclist. He competed in the men's individual road race at the 1996 Summer Olympics.

References

External links
 

1967 births
Living people
Argentine male cyclists
Olympic cyclists of Argentina
Cyclists at the 1996 Summer Olympics
Cyclists from Buenos Aires
Pan American Games medalists in cycling
Pan American Games bronze medalists for Argentina
Medalists at the 1999 Pan American Games
Cyclists at the 1999 Pan American Games